The Raised on Radio Tour was a concert tour by the American rock band Journey. The tour was the last with lead singer Steve Perry. Session players Randy Jackson and Mike Baird played bass and drums, respectively, as Ross Valory and Steve Smith were fired during recording sessions for the album. Valory and Smith, however, received their percentage of the profits from the tour.

The tour started on August 23, 1986, at the Mountain Aire Festival in Angels Camp, California and ended February 1, 1987 in Anchorage, Alaska. Opening acts for the tour included Honeymoon Suite, The Outfield, Glass Tiger and Andy Taylor from Duran Duran. The tour was videotaped by MTV and made into a documentary, which includes interviews and concert footage of the band at the height of their career. State of the art computerized lighting and large movable video screens that resembled pool table holders were used as part of the elaborate stage design.

Perry left the band at the conclusion of the last concert, citing that he was tired of touring, which in turn was affecting his health and voice, and did not like the band's music being used in commercials or other endeavors:

Personnel
 Steve Perry – lead vocals
 Neal Schon – lead guitar, backing vocals
 Jonathan Cain – keyboards, rhythm guitar, backing vocals
 Randy Jackson – bass, backing vocals
 Mike Baird – drums

Setlist

Songs played overall
 "Only the Young"
 "Stone in Love"
 "Any Way You Want It"
 "Girl Can't Help It"
 "I'll Be Alright Without You"
 "Foolish Heart" (originally performed by Steve Perry)
 "Too Late"
 "After the Fall"
 "Send Her My Love"
 "Open Arms"
 "Still They Ride"
 "Strung Out" (originally performed by Steve Perry)
 "Suzanne"
 "Patiently"
 "Lights"
 "Moon Theme"
 "Wheel in the Sky"
 "Raised on Radio"
 "Ask the Lonely"
 "Who's Crying Now"
 "Oh Sherrie" (originally performed by Steve Perry)
 "No More Lies" (originally performed by Neal Schon and Jan Hammer)
 "Lovin', Touchin', Squeezin'"
 "Jailhouse Rock" (originally performed by Elvis Presley)
 "Separate Ways (Worlds Apart)"
Encore
 "Be Good to Yourself"
 "Don't Stop Believin'"
 "Stand By Me" (originally performed by Ben E. King)
 "Auld Lang Syne" (originally performed by Robert Burns)
 "Reach Out I'll Be There" (originally performed by The Four Tops)
 "Take Me Back to Ohio"
 "Faithfully"

Typical setlist
 "Only the Young"
 "Stone in Love"
 "Any Way You Want It"
 "Girl Can't Help It"
 "I'll Be Alright Without You"
 "Send Her My Love"
 "Open Arms"
 "Still They Ride"
 "Strung Out" (originally performed by Steve Perry)
 "Suzanne"
 "Lights"
 "Wheel in the Sky"
 "Raised on Radio"
 "Ask the Lonely"
 "Who's Crying Now"
 "Oh Sherrie" (originally performed by Steve Perry)
 "Lovin', Touchin', Squeezin'"
 "Jailhouse Rock" (originally performed by Elvis Presley)
 "Separate Ways (Worlds Apart)"
Encore
 "Be Good to Yourself"
 "Don't Stop Believin'"
 "Faithfully"

Tour dates

Cancelled shows

References

1986 concert tours
1987 concert tours
Journey (band) concert tours